(aka For the Damaged Right Eye) is a short film by Toshio Matsumoto made in 1968 the year before his feature film Funeral Parade of Roses. It features some of the same milieu, presented through three projectors running at simultaneously. Since projectors do not all run at the same speed, the images can go "out of sync," and each projection of the film can be different.

References

External links
Google Video of "For the Damaged Right Eye" 
 

1968 films
Japanese black-and-white films
Films directed by Toshio Matsumoto
1960s Japanese films